Milena Slavova is a Bulgarian punk rock singer.

She has been a founding member of Review.

She had a television show called Рок с Милена (Rock with Milena) on BNT2.

Discography  
 МИЛЕНА + РЕВЮ (1989)
 Ха-ха (1991)
 Скандалът(1993)
 Sold (1994)
 Дъ best + (1999)
 13 (2015)

References

External links 
 
 Milena Slavova at Bulgarian Rock Archives

Living people
Bulgarian rock singers
20th-century Bulgarian women singers
Musicians from Sofia
1966 births